Bramfelder See is a lake in Steilshoop, Hamburg, Germany which is named after the nearby former village of Bramfeld. It is fed by several springs, among others from the former swamp of Prökelmoor, located today on the compound of nearby Ohlsdorf Cemetery. Bramfelder See extends to a length of 1.2km and to a width of between 100 and 400m, and to a depth of up to 3m. Four islands are located in the lake. The stream of Seebek flows from the lake in a southerly direction.

In the night of 17 to 18 January 2010 unknown perpetrators broke the lock at the outlet sluice and let the water under the ice of the lake drain into Seebek stream. As a result, the majority of the fish population died. The Sport Fishing Association Elbe e.V. feared that it will take years until the lake is recovering from this disaster.

References

Lakes of Hamburg
LBramfelder See